Sugarloaf Township is the name of some places in the U.S. state of Pennsylvania:

Sugarloaf Township, Columbia County, Pennsylvania
Sugarloaf Township, Luzerne County, Pennsylvania

Pennsylvania township disambiguation pages